Osmo Karjalainen (2 February 1940 – 5 April 2013) was a Finnish cross-country skier. He competed in the men's 15 kilometre event at the 1972 Winter Olympics.

Cross-country skiing results

Olympic Games

World Championships

References

External links
 

1940 births
2013 deaths
Finnish male cross-country skiers
Olympic cross-country skiers of Finland
Cross-country skiers at the 1972 Winter Olympics
People from Ii
Sportspeople from North Ostrobothnia